The Oceanside City Hall and Fire Station, also known as Oceanside Civic Center, at 704 and 714 Third St. in Oceanside, California, was built in 1929.  It was listed on the National Register of Historic Places in 1989.

It consists of two buildings, a single-story L-shaped city hall and a two-story fire station with a  tower, which are visually linked by a retaining wall.

The buildings were designed by architect Irving J. Gill in 1929 as part of a larger civic complex which was not completed.

The listing included one contributing object.

References

National Register of Historic Places in San Diego County, California
Mission Revival architecture in California
Moderne architecture in the United States
Government buildings completed in 1929
City and town halls on the National Register of Historic Places in California
Fire stations on the National Register of Historic Places in California